Dhobi known in some places as Dhoba or Rajaka, Madivala is a group of community in India and the greater Indian subcontinent whose traditional occupations are washing and ironing, Cultivator, agricultural workers.

They are a large community, distributed across northern, central, western and eastern India; as well as in Bangladesh, Pakistan, Nepal, and Sri Lanka. A majority of the community associate themselves with Hinduism. Many religiously follow Sant Gadge (Gadge Maharaj), whose jayanti (birth anniversary) they celebrate every 23 February.

The word dhobi is derived from the Hindi word dhona, which means 'to wash'. As such, Dhobi communities in many areas today come under the status of Schedule Caste in many status, while Other Backward Class in other states and region.

In 2017, Supreme Court of India noted calling people dhobi was offensive.

Origins

In mythology 

There is a tradition that they are descendants of the mythological hero Virabhadra, who was ordered by Shiva to wash the clothes of all men, as an expiation of the sin of putting many people to death in Dakshas Yaga, hence the South India dhobis are frequently called virabhadran

Synonyms

Rajasthan 
Dhobi or Dhoba,have derived the name from the Hindi word dhona which means to wash.They claim to have originated from Rajput. They are distributed all over the state. Their main concentration is in Ajmer district.  They speak in Mewari and Hindi and Devnagari script. The Dhobi are non-vegetarian, The community has twelve exogamous ataks clans Some of them are Chauhan, Marwara, Hilogia.

Haryana 
The Dhobi of Haryana are said to have originated from Punjab and Rajasthan. They are scattered throughout the state. Like other Hindu communities, they are divided into clans called gotras. Some of the major gotras are the Chauhan, Shukravar, Rajoria, Tonwar, Panwar, Badera, Satmase, Akhasriya, Mahavar, Basvadiya and Sunaria. These clan names are also used as surnames. There main occupation remains washing of and drying of clothes. A small number of Dhobi are marginal farmers.

Maharastra 
In Maharashtra, the Dhobi are found throughout the state, and are also known as Parit. They claim to have originally belonged to the Rajput community, and in particular the Chauhan clan. The Dhobi have been listed as an Other Backward Class. They speak Marathi among themselves,and Hindi with outsiders.
 The community are endogamous, and practice clan exogamy. There main clans in Maharashtra are the Abidkar, Bannolkar, Belwarkar, Chawhan, Chawlkar, Chewakar, Dhongde, Gaikwad, Ghousalkar, Harmekar, Hedulkar, Kalyankar, Kanekar, Kalatkar, Lad, Malekar, Nandgaonkar, Nane, Pawar, Pabrekar, Palkar, Purwarkar, Salekar, and Waskar. Marriage within the clan is prohibited.

Karnataka 
The Agasa a washerfolk community,are also known as Madivala, Nanjundayya and Iyer (1928) record that on the occasion of Dakshabrahma's sacrifice, Lord Siva created a ferocious person, Virabhadra, who in his anger, got his clothes bloodstained while killing Daksha and his com panions. Virabhadra appeared before Lord Shiva and thought lessly allowed his impure garments to come in contact with the god.

Uttar Pradesh 
Perhaps the largest concentration of Dhobis is found in Uttar Pradesh. They have been granted scheduled caste status. The community is strictly endogamous, and practice clan exogamy. Their main clans, known as gotras, are the Ayodhiabasi, Mathur, Srivash, Belwar and Jaiswar. Belwar, practice hypergamy, with clans of lower status giving girls in marriage to those of higher status, but not receiving girls. They are used titles like KanaujiaDiwakar, Bharti, Choudhary etc. They speak the various dialects of Hindi, such as Khari boli and Awadhi

The Dhobi are still involved in their traditional occupation, which is washing clothes. Traditionally, the community would wash clothes for particular families, and would receive grain and services from them. But with the growth of the cash economy, most Dhobi are now paid money for their services. A significant number of Dhobis are cultivators, and this particularly so in western Uttar Pradesh. They live in multi-caste villages, but occupy their own distinct quarters. Each of their settlement contains an informal caste council, known as a biradari panchayat. The panchayat acts as instrument of social control, dealing with issues such as divorce and adultery.

Andhra pradhesh 

Rajaka Community Rajaka community has two dependant sub-castes, namely Patamuvaru and Ganjikutivaru. They are also called Patamollu, Patamchakallu or Arogya Brahmins in Andhra Pradesh. They recite Rajaka Puranam which is also called Basavapuranam or Basava Vijayamu with the help of Coprtad at 96 Art and Culture of Marginalised Nomadic Tribes in Andhra.a Patam in which they trace the origin and evolution of the Rajaka community. There is a legend regarding the origin of Patamuvaru. According to it,Virabhadra who was sent to destroy Daksha Yajna by Lord Shiva, was supposed to have committed a grave sin by the destruction of Yajna which was equal to that of killing of gods. Siva though admired Virabhadra for his valour and achievement, ordered him to wash the clothes of gods to propitiate his sin. Virabhadra went to Swarnakamala sarasu and he was very much disturbed how to do this job. While he was worrying about the ignominy of such act, two drops of his sweat fell on two Kamalams (lotus flowers) in the lake. One such drop emerged as Madivala Machideva who was ordered to wash the clothes of gods. After completing the job, he approached Virabhadra and prayed him to show him the source for his livelihood. Virabhadra asked him to go to Bhuloka and wash the clothes of men and thus earn his livelihood. His progeny came to be known as Rajakas. Another person who emerged from the drop of sweat of Virabhdra from another lotus flower refused to wash the clothes. He was cursed by Virabhadra to depend on the Rajakas for the livelihood. Thus a dependant caste of Patamuvaru came into being5 The story of Madivelu Machaiah is also described in Basavapuranam. We also find Machaiah katha in the folk songs of Karnataka. The Rajakas worship Madivelu Machaiah as an incarnation of Virabhadra. Patamuvaru visit their Mirasi villages once in three years to recite Rajaka Puranam and Gotras of Rajakas.In the Rajaka Puranam they narrate Madivelu Machaiah's origin, family and the war between Madivelu Machaiah and Bijala Raju

Tamil Nadu 

Vannar belongs to the Valangai ("Right-hand caste faction"). Some of The Valangai comprised castes with an agricultural basis while the Idangai consisted of castes involved in manufacturing, Valangai, which was better organised politically

About Tamil Vannar and Vaduka Vannar
As told in the histories of Bharatavarsha 

In the Tirunelveli region, Thai deities (female deities) are worshiped in large numbers and are worshiped with a pedestal or trident. in states like Karnataka and Andhra Pradesh,Vannars are still the priests of the Mariamman temple

Kerala 

Kerala Dhobis can be called mannan or vannan, at the Pooram festival in Kerala, the goddess is usually seen wearing a white robe with a large handle in red green orange black white colours

In India, the largest Dasara festival is held in October in Karnataka and Tamil Nadu during the month of October, the honorable sword given at Dasara is given to the vannan only

Mannan are also the priests of the Bhagavati Amman temple

Dandu army clan 
Dandu Agasa indicating army washerman occurs as a name for some Maratha Dhobis in 
Mysore, whose forefathers probably accompanied armies in times of War.

Demographics

Notable peoples 

 Chintamoni Dhoba: Ruler of Dhalbhum region and established capital at Ambikanagar.
 Gadge Maharaj: Marathi Hindu saint.

See also 
Dhobi Ghat, Mumbai
Dhobi Ghat, 2010 movie
 Hēna

References

External links 

Cheppedu found at Chidambaram Natarajar Temple and these are the people who came through Veerapathiran

Social groups of India
Laundry
Social groups of Pakistan
Dalit communities
Scheduled Castes of Uttar Pradesh
Scheduled Castes of Bihar
Scheduled Castes of Rajasthan
Scheduled Castes of Jharkhand
Scheduled Castes of Odisha
Scheduled Castes of Assam
Scheduled Castes of Madhya Pradesh
Scheduled Castes of Delhi
Scheduled Castes of Uttarakhand
Scheduled Castes of Mizoram
Scheduled Castes of Meghalaya
Other Backward Classes of Karnataka